George Reynolds Gill (1828 in Hereford, Herefordshire – 1904) was a noted English portrait painter.

References

1828 births
1904 deaths
19th-century English painters
English male painters
20th-century English painters
English portrait painters
20th-century English male artists
19th-century English male artists